Harvard was a station on the Englewood Branch of the Chicago "L" and was the northern terminus of the Normal Park Branch. The station opened on November 3, 1906, and closed on February 9, 1992.   It was demolished during the Green Line reconstruction of 1994–1996. The CTA considered constructing a new station at Harvard with a new park and ride lot that would have connected to the 63rd station on the Dan Ryan branch. No funding was available for the project and as a result the reconstruction did not happen.

References

External links
Harvard Station Page at Chicago-L.org

Railway stations in the United States opened in 1906
Railway stations closed in 1992
1906 establishments in Illinois
1992 disestablishments in Illinois
Defunct Chicago "L" stations